Anetia thirza, the cloud-forest monarch, is a butterfly of the family Nymphalidae. It is found Mexico and Central America (including El Salvador, Costa Rica and Panama).

The larvae possibly feed on Metastelma and Cynanchum species.

Subspecies
Anetia thirza thirza (Mexico)
Anetia thirza insignis (Salvin, 1869) (Costa Rica, Panama)

thirza
Nymphalidae of South America
Butterflies described in 1833